Seventh Heaven was one of the most popular Broadway plays of the 1920s.

Production
Seventh Heaven was written by Austin Strong and produced by John Golden. It ran at the Booth Theatre from October 30, 1922, to July 1924 for a total of 704 performances. The leads were played by George Gaul as Chico and Helen Menken as Diane. Also in the cast of the play was Frank Morgan as Brissac.

Cast

Helen Menken as Diane
George Gaul as Chico
Frank Morgan as Brissac
Herbert Druce as Boul'
Alfred Kappeler as Maximalian Gobin
Marion Kerby as Nana
William Post as Pere Chevillon
Isabel West as Aunt Valentine
Harry Forsman as Uncle Georges
Fred Holloway as The Rat
Beatrice Noyes as Arlette
Bernard Thornton as Recan
Lionel Joseph as Lamplighter
Richard Carlyle as Blonde 
John Clements as Sergeant of Police

Plot
Young girl Diane is falling in love with Chico during World War I in France.

Adaptations
Two films have been made based on the original Broadway play.
A 1927 silent film of the same title was written by Benjamin Glazer and directed by Frank Borzage.
A 1937 remake was produced as a sound film starring Simone Simon, James Stewart, Jean Hersholt, and Gregory Ratoff, with Henry King directing.

In 1955 the musical adaptation Seventh Heaven opened on Broadway starring Gloria DeHaven, Ricardo Montalban and Kurt Kasznar.  Bea Arthur, Chita Rivera and Gerrianne Raphael were also in the cast.  It ran for only 44 performances.

References

External links
 Full text at the Internet Archive
 

1922 plays
Broadway plays